Jaguar S-Type is the name of two vehicles:

 Jaguar S-Type (1963) (1963–1968)
 Jaguar S-Type (1999) (1999–2007)